Samuel Smith was an early settler of Norwalk, Connecticut. He was a deputy of the General Assembly of the Colony of Connecticut from Norwalk in the May 1691 session.

Due to the commonality of the name, and conflicting records, it is difficult to determine the exact origins of Samuel Smith. He was, perhaps, the son of Captain William Smith, a magistrate in Weymouth, Massachusetts Bay Colony. He moved to Norwalk as a young man, and he listed among its earliest settlers. His father-in-law, Matthew Marvin Sr. gave Smith half of his home lot and orchard.

In 1672, he owned "a parcel of land in Indian Field," not far from the Norwalk-Westport boundary.

He was named a freeman in 1674. In 1679, he served as town treasurer. He was on a committee, along with Matthew Marvin Sr., and John Bowton to obtain a minister for the settlement, which appointed Reverend Thomas Hanford. He served as a deputy of the Connecticut General Court in 1691. He was a townsman in 1698, 1702, 1706, and 1712. In 1702, he was selectman.

In 1680 or 1681 he owned a home-lot of four acres adjacent to Strawberry Hill.

References 

1646 births
1735 deaths
American Puritans
Burials in East Norwalk Historical Cemetery
Connecticut city council members
Deputies of the Connecticut General Assembly (1662–1698)
Politicians from Norwalk, Connecticut
Settlers of Connecticut
Burials in Connecticut